The 5M model is a troubleshooting and risk-management model used for aviation safety.

Original labels
Based on T.P. Wright's original work on the man-machine-environment triad at Cornell University, the 5M model incorporates a diagram of 3 interlocking circles and one all-encompassing circle. The smaller circles are labeled Man, Machine, and Medium; the intersecting space in the middle, where they all meet, is labeled Mission; while the larger circle is labeled Management:

 Man (people): including the physiology and psychology of those involved, as well as their performance and proficiency. 
 Machine (equipment): including the design, manufacture, maintenance, reliability, performance, etc. 
 Medium / measurement (environment, inspection): including weather, terrain, obstructions, lighting, etc. 
 Mission (purpose): the reason these three factors are brought together. 
 Management (leadership): the prevailing supervisory approach in terms of regulations, policies, procedures, and attitude involved in establishing, operating, maintaining, and decommissioning.

Expansion
These have been expanded by some to include an additional three, and are referred to as the 8 Ms:
Material (includes raw material, consumables, and information)
Method / mother nature (process, environment)
Maintenance

Other uses
This is also used in more general troubleshooting or root-cause analysis, such as with the Ishikawa diagram.

References

See also 
 Ishikawa diagram

Aviation safety
Quality control tools